Palk Bay is a semi-enclosed shallow water body between the southeast coast of India and Sri Lanka, with a water depth maximum of 13 m. Palk Bay is located between 8° 50′ and 10° North latitudes and 78° 50′ and 80° 30′ East longitudes. The width of Palk Bay ranges from 57 to 107 km and the length is around 150 km. Palk Bay is considered to be one amongst the major sinks for sediments along with Gulf of Mannar. Sediments discharged by rivers and transported by the surf currents as littoral drift settle in this sink. Few scientists have tried to understand the wave characteristics within the Palk Bay.

In the southern regions close to Dhanushkodi, wind seas dominate. The north-eastern region of Palk Bay is exposed to the Bay of Bengal through the shallow Palk Strait and hence the swells can enter the Palk Bay through this opening. To the south of Palk Bay, Adam's Bridge separates Palk Bay from the Gulf of Mannar. Despite being a very shallow channel, Wave effects are transmitted to a small extent through the Adam's Bridge passage. It is interesting to notice that, despite the visible block along the Adam's Bridge, the passage of Wind wave and Ocean current (to a very small extent) from Gulf of Mannar to the bay is evident. Meanwhile, even with wide and broader opening along the north-eastern borders of the bay, facing the Bay of Bengal, the Wind wave and Ocean current fluxes are less significant here.

Ramayana and Palk Bay 
Palk Bay is associated with an ancient Sanskrit epic Ramayana popular over the Indian Subcontinent,  which follows Prince Rama's quest to rescue his beloved wife Sita from the clutches of Ravana with the help of an army of Vaanaras (monkeys). It is traditionally attributed to the authorship of the sage Valmiki and dated to around 500 BCE to 100 BCE. The epic describes how Prince Rama and his followers managed to cross the Palk Bay to reach Lanka (Sri Lanka) to save Sita.

References

Bodies of water of Jaffna District
Bodies of water of Kilinochchi District